Herd, mob, or pack mentality describes how people can be influenced by the majority.

Social psychologists study the related topics of group intelligence, crowd wisdom, groupthink, and deindividuation.

History 
The idea of a "group mind" or "mob behavior" was first put forward by 19th-century social psychologists Gabriel Tarde and Gustave Le Bon. Herd behavior in human societies has also been studied by Sigmund Freud and Wilfred Trotter, whose book Instincts of the Herd in Peace and War is a classic in the field of social psychology. Sociologist and economist Thorstein Veblen's The Theory of the Leisure Class illustrates how individuals imitate other group members of higher social status in their consumer behavior. More recently, Malcolm Gladwell in The Tipping Point, examines how cultural, social, and economic factors converge to create trends in consumer behavior. In 2004, the New Yorker financial columnist James Surowiecki published The Wisdom of Crowds.

Twenty-first-century academic fields such as marketing and behavioral finance attempt to identify and predict the rational and irrational behavior of investors. (See the work of Daniel Kahneman, Robert Shiller, Vernon L. Smith, and Amos Tversky.) Driven by emotional reactions such as greed and fear, investors can be seen to join in frantic purchasing and sales of stocks, creating bubbles and crashes. As a result, herd behavior is closely studied by behavioral finance experts in order to help predict future economic crises.

Research

The Asch conformity experiments (1951) involved a series of studies directed by American Psychologist Solomon Asch that measured the effects of majority group belief and opinion on individuals. Fifty male students from Swarthmore College participated in a vision test with a line judgement task. 

A naive participant was put in a room with seven confederates (i.e. actors) who had agreed in advance to match their responses. The participant was not aware of this and was told that the actors were also naive participants.  There was one control condition with no confederates. Confederates purposefully gave the wrong answer on 12 trials. The other participant usually went with the group and said the wrong answer. 

Through 18 trials total, Asch (1951) found that one third (33%) of naive participants conformed with the clearly incorrect majority, with 75% of participants over the 12 trials. Fewer than 1% of participants gave the wrong answer when there were no confederates.

Researchers at Leeds University performed a group experiment in which volunteers were told to randomly walk around a large hall without talking to each other. A select few were then given more detailed instructions on where to walk. The scientists discovered that people end up blindly following one or two instructed people who appear to know where they are going. The results of this experiment showed that it only takes 5% of confident looking and instructed people to influence the direction of the other 95% of people in the crowd, and the 200 volunteers did this without even realizing it.

Researchers from Hebrew University, NYU, and MIT explored herd mentality in online spaces, specifically in the context of "digitized, aggregated opinions." Online comments were given an initial positive or negative vote (up or down) on an undisclosed website over five months.  The control group comments were left alone. 

The researchers found that "the first person reading the comment was 32% more likely to upvote it if it had been already given a fake positive score." Over the five months, comments artificially rated positively showed a 25% higher average score than the control group, with the initial negative vote ending up with no statistical significance in comparison to the control group. The researchers found that "prior ratings created significant bias in individual rating behavior, and positive and negative social influences created asymmetric herding effects." 

"That is a significant change," Dr. Aral, one of the researchers involved in the experiment, stated. "We saw how these very small signals of social influence snowballed into behaviors like herding."

See also

 Anonymity
 Anxiety
 Argumentum ad populum
 Bandwagon effect
 Cancel culture
 Collective intelligence
 Conformity
 Critical mass (sociodynamics)
 Crowd abuse
 Crowd  psychology
 Decentralized decision making
 Delphi method
 Doomscrolling
 Early adopter
 Folie à deux
 Freethought
 Fear
 Groupthink
 Herd behavior
 Information cascade
 List of most-disliked YouTube videos
 Manipulation (psychology)
 Mass psychogenic illness (mass hysteria)
 Monkey see, monkey do
 Opinion leadership
 Peer pressure
 Predictive market
 Riot
 Sheeple
 Social network
 Slave morality
 The Emperor's New Clothes
 The Wisdom of Crowds
 Trial by media

Philosophers
 Søren Kierkegaard
 Friedrich Nietzsche
 José Ortega y Gasset
 Everett Dean Martin

References

Further reading
 Bloom, Howard, The Global Brain: The Evolution of Mass Mind from the Big Bang to the 21st Century. (2000) John Wiley & Sons, New York.
 Freud, Sigmund's Massenpsychologie und Ich-Analyse (1921; English translation Group Psychology and the Analysis of the Ego, *1922). Reprinted 1959 Liveright, New York.
 Gladwell, Malcolm, The Tipping Point: How Little Things Can Make a Big Difference. (2002) Little, Brown & Co., Boston.
 Le Bon, Gustav, Les Lois psychologiques de l'évolution des peuples. (1894) National Library of France, Paris.
 Le Bon, Gustave, The Crowd: A Study of the Popular Mind. (1895)  Project Gutenberg.
 Martin, Everett Dean, The Behavior of Crowds (1920).
 McPhail, Clark.  The Myth of the Madding Crowd (1991) Aldine-DeGruyter.
 Trotter, Wilfred, Instincts of the Herd in Peace and War. (1915) Macmillan, New York.
 Suroweicki, James: The Wisdom of Crowds: Why the Many Are Smarter Than the Few and How Collective Wisdom Shapes Business, Economies, *Societies and Nations. (2004) Little, Brown, Boston.
 Sunstein, Cass, Infotopia: How Many Minds Produce Knowledge. (2006) Oxford University Press, Oxford, United Kingdom.

External links

 The Wisdom of Crowds and Iowa Electronic Market Statistics 

Figures of speech
Social psychology
Group processes
zh-yue:羊群效應